Sarhadd Aqa (also Romanized as Sarḩadd Āqā and Sar Had Āqā) is a village in Howmeh Rural District, in the Central District of Behbahan County, Khuzestan Province, Iran. At the 2006 census, its population was 150, in 30 families.

References 

Populated places in Behbahan County